Stupp is a surname of German origin, with several possible meanings. Notable people with the surname include:

Abraham Stupp (1897-1968), Israeli politician
Dagmar Stupp, German former canoeist
Dann Stupp (born 1978), American sports editor and author
Howard Stupp (born 1955), Canadian former wrestler
Samuel I. Stupp (born 1951), Costa Rican chemist and professor

See also
Stupp–Oxenrider Farm, a historic farm complex in Pennsylvania
Stepp